Clément Vautel, pen name of Clément-Henri Vaulet (31 January 1876 – 23 December 1954) was a journalist, novelist and playwright of Belgian origin, naturalized French (1897).

Biography 
Clément Vautel wrote for numerous periodicals, including Le Charivari, La Liberté, Gil Blas, La Presse, Le Rire, Le Matin (from 1908 to 1914), Le Journal (from 1918 to 1940), Cyrano...

Publications 
1919: La Réouverture du paradis terrestre, novel
1921: Les Folies bourgeoises, novel
1922: Mademoiselle Sans-gêne, novel
1922: Monsieur Palémon chez les Dingos, novel
1923: Candide, 5-act play
1923: La Machine à fabriquer des rêves
1923: Mon curé chez les riches, novel, Albin Michel
1924: Madame ne veut pas d'enfant, novel
1925: Mon curé chez les pauvres, novel, Albin Michel
1926: Je suis un affreux bourgeois, novel
1927: L'Amour à la parisienne, novel
1928: Le Bouif chez mon curé, written with Georges de La Fouchardière, novel
1928: Voyage au pays des snobs
1929: La Grande rafle, written with Georges de La Fouchardière, novel
1930: Autour et alentour
1930: L'Empereur aux yeux bleus, historical novel, written with Raymond Escholier
1932: Les Femmes aux enchères, novel
1934: La Petite-fille de Madame Angot, novel
1939: Le Fou de l'Élysée, pamphlet novel
1941 « Mon film », souvenirs d'un journaliste
1942: Candide Paturot à la recherche d'un idéal, petite histoire contemporaine
1946: Le Prince impérial, histoire du fils de Napoléon III
1949: M. Désiré Jolibois au paradis
1951: Les Maris, les Amants et la Femme, histoire des cocus célèbres depuis les temps les plus reculés jusqu'à nos jours
1952: Le Bon Sens et la Vie

Cinema

Scripts 
 1920: Monsieur Lebureau by Luitz-Morat
 1927: Parisian Pleasures by

Adaptations 
 1925: Mon curé chez les riches by Émile-Bernard Donatien
 1925: Mon curé chez les pauvres by Donatien
 1926: Madame Wants No Children by Alexander Korda
 1932: Mon curé chez les riches by Donatien
 1933: Madame Wants No Children by Hans Steinhoff
 1938: Mon curé chez les riches by Jean Boyer
 1952: Mon curé chez les riches by Henri Diamant-Berger
 1956: Mon curé chez les pauvres by Henri Diamant-Berger

References

External links 
 
 Clément Vautel on bibliopoche.com
 Clément Vautel on Babelio
 Le préjugé antisémite entre « bon sens » et humour gaulois by Clément Vautel on CAIRN
 Clément Vautel, La grève des bourgeois
 
 Clément Vautel, Le féminisme en 1958

1876 births
1954 deaths
20th-century French journalists
20th-century French novelists
Writers from Tournai
Belgian emigrants to France